Andrea Fabbrini (born 29 November 1974 in Cassino) is an Italian football striker.

External links
Profile at Lega-Calcio.it

1974 births
Living people
Italian footballers
Modena F.C. players
Torino F.C. players
F.C. Pro Vercelli 1892 players
L.R. Vicenza players
Association football forwards
Serie A players
Sportspeople from the Province of Frosinone
Footballers from Lazio